Frank Tate  (18 June 1864 – 28 June 1939) was an Australian educationist who is best remembered for his efforts in expanding secondary education in Victoria, Australia.

Early life
Tate was born at Mopoke Gully, near Castlemaine, Victoria, the son of Aristides Franklin (usually called Henry) Tate, a storekeeper, and his wife Mary Bessy, née Lomas, both English born. Frank Tate was educated at the Castlemaine State School, the Old Model School, Melbourne, and the University of Melbourne (B.A., 1888; M.A., 1894). Tate entered the teachers' training college in 1883 and gained the trained teacher's certificate with first and second honours. His first charge was a small school near East Kew on the outskirts of Melbourne. He quickly made an impression as an able and stimulating young teacher and many students were sent to his school for teaching experience.

Career
In 1889 Tate was appointed a junior lecturer in the training college and became much interested in teaching methods. At the end of 1893, following the great financial crisis, the college was closed, but Tate was given charge of classes in Melbourne for the training of pupil teachers. In 1895 after an Education Department reshuffle, Tate was appointed an inspector for the Charlton district, and spent four years inspecting its 136 schools and incidentally learning a great deal about the problems of small rural schools and their teachers. Tate became a well-known speaker at teachers' congresses and enhanced his reputation as an educationist when giving evidence before the technical education commission. 

Tate was appointed principal of the Melbourne Training College when it was re-opened in February 1900, and vigorously set to work to make up as far as possible the ground lost while the college was closed. Tate kept the subject of English in his own hands, considering it to be the basic subject of education, and steadily brought before his students the opportunities for service to the community possessed by enlightened teachers. In March 1902 when it was announced that he had been appointed as the first director of education in Victoria he was only 38 years old. Many men of much longer service had been passed over, but it appears to have been generally recognised that he was the fit man for the position.

When Tate took up his directorship, education in Victoria had long been starved and neglected. The state had been going through a period of lean years, but the new director felt that money spent on education would more than repay itself. Tate felt too that well-educated and capable men and women could not be attracted to an ill-paid profession with little prospect of promotion. He set out to do away with pupil-teachers, to improve the training of teachers, to obtain better pay for them, to encourage school committees, and to suggest to each community that the local state school was not merely a state school—it was their school. New methods of instruction were brought in, the chief object being the development of a child's mind instead of merely cramming it with facts. Tate felt too that secondary and technical education was being neglected and in June 1904 presented a report on "Some Aspects of Education in New Zealand" in which he showed how far behind Victoria was lagging in this field.

In 1905 a bill was introduced in the Victorian parliament for the registration of teachers and schools not administered by the education department. This was passed and had much effect in raising the qualifications and status of secondary school teachers. When it was determined that Tate should attend the conference on education held in London in May 1907 he took the opportunity of making a special study of these problems in Europe and the United States of America. Soon after his return he published a "Preliminary Report upon Observations made during an Official Visit to Europe and America" (1908). In this report he showed that a "ladder of education" was required. Primary schools formed a necessary basis, but on these must be imposed higher elementary schools, secondary schools and agricultural high schools, all leading on to the university or agricultural college. Technical colleges for young people engaged in industry must also be much more encouraged. In a striking diagram he showed that of the money spent by the state of Victoria on education 93.1% was for primary education and less than one per cent for secondary education. In another diagram he demonstrated that New Zealand, whose population was 20% less than that of Victoria, was spending three times as much on technical education and over ten times as much on secondary education. 

Tate persisted in his fight for a better state of things and gradually imposed his views on parliament. In the education act of 1910 which Tate drafted, provision was made for the constitution of a council of public education. It consisted of representatives of the university, the education department, technical schools, public and private schools, and industrial interests. Its duties were to report to the minister upon public education in other countries, and matters in connexion with public education referred to it by the minister. It also took over the duties of the teachers and schools registration board. The discussions of this council have proved of great value in the consideration of problems of public education in Victoria. Tate was chairman of this committee, and he also remained in touch with the university as a member of its council.

Late life and legacy
When Tate retired from the education department in 1928 no fewer than 128 higher elementary schools and 36 high schools had been established in Victoria, and there had been an increase of 50 per cent in the number of technical schools. Tate had also paid two visits to London and had sat on commissions dealing with education in New Zealand, Fiji, and Southern Rhodesia. After his retirement in 1928, Tate became president (1930–39) of the Australian Council for Educational Research and never lost his interest in educational problems. 

Tate died at Caulfield, Melbourne on 28 June 1939; he had married Ada Hodgkiss on 2 October 1888, who died in 1932, and was survived by two sons and a daughter of their six children. The Imperial Service Order was conferred on him in 1903 and he was created C.M.G. in 1919. In addition to the reports mentioned Tate edited As You Like It in the Australasian Shakespeare (1916), and in 1920 published as a pamphlet, Continued Education, Our Opportunity and our Obligation. Tate was a good popular lecturer on Shakespearian and other subjects.  The Secondary Teachers College Hostel is named 'Frank Tate House'. There is also a building at The University of Melbourne's Parkville campus named after him.

References

External links
Frank Tate and his work for education at the National Library of Australia

1864 births
1939 deaths
Australian educators
Companions of the Order of St Michael and St George
People from Castlemaine, Victoria